Michele Bush-Cuke (born 3 October 1961) is a Caymanian long-distance runner. She competed in the 10,000 metres at the 1987 World Championships without reaching the final, and finished 52nd in the women's marathon at the 1988 Summer Olympics.

Her personal best marathon pace is 2 hours and 37 minutes. She graduated in 1979 from Rolling Hills High School.

References

External links
 

1961 births
Living people
Athletes (track and field) at the 1987 Pan American Games
Athletes (track and field) at the 1988 Summer Olympics
Caymanian female long-distance runners
Caymanian female marathon runners
Olympic athletes of the Cayman Islands
Place of birth missing (living people)
Pan American Games competitors for the Cayman Islands
World Athletics Championships athletes for the Cayman Islands